Cournon-d'Auvergne (Auvergnat: Cornon d'Auvèrnhe) is a commune in the Puy-de-Dôme department in Auvergne-Rhône-Alpes in central France.

Population

Twin towns
 Lichtenfels, Germany, since 1992
 Ariccia, Italy, since 4 March 2000

See also
Communes of the Puy-de-Dôme department

References

Cournondauvergne